The 1946–47 Penn State Nittany Lions men's ice hockey season was the 6th season of play for the program. The Nittany Lions represented Pennsylvania State University and were coached by James O'Hora in his 1st season.

Season
After the end of the war, many of the players on previous teams returned to campus. Penn State restarted its ice hockey program in 1946 and arranged a few games but the problems that had plagued the team before had not been resolved. The program still didn't have a home building and the cost of travelling for all of its games was a burden. On top of that, despite having veteran players, the team wasn't competitive in any of its games. After the year the school made the only choice it had a discontinued the varsity program. It would later resurface as a club team in the early 1970s and eventually return to varsity status in 2012

Roster

Standings

Schedule and Results

|-
!colspan=12 style=";" | Regular Season

Scoring Statistics

References

External links

Penn State Nittany Lions men's ice hockey seasons
Penn State
Penn State
Penn State
Penn State